Matt Armondo Conte (October 5, 1926 – March 17, 2012) was an American football player and coach. He served as the head football coach at St. Bonaventure University in Allegany, New York from 1968 to 1970.

References

1926 births
2012 deaths
St. Bonaventure Brown Indians football coaches
St. Bonaventure Brown Indians football players
High school football coaches in Arizona
People from Scranton, Pennsylvania
Players of American football from Pennsylvania